U-Prince Series is a 2016–2017 Thai television series produced by GMMTV together with Baa-Ram-Ewe. Directed by Chatkaew Susiwa and Kanittha Kwanyu, it is a twelve-part series based from Jamsai's novels on twelve stories of handsome guys coming from twelve different faculties of a university. Every segment features a couple together with some of the recurring characters in the story.

Starting with a behind the scenes special episode on 15 May 2016, the series officially premiered on GMM 25 and LINE TV on 22 May 2016, airing on Sundays at 20:00 ICT (later, at 20:30 ICT on 4 June 2017 and onwards) and 22:00 ICT (later, at 22:30 ICT on 4 June 2017 and onwards), respectively. The series concluded on 2 July 2017.

Cast and characters

Main

Handsome Cowboy 
 Puttichai Kasetsin (Push) as Sibtis
 Esther Supreeleela as Prikkang

Gentle Vet 
 Vorakorn Sirisorn (Kang) as Thesis
 Sutatta Udomsilp (Punpun) as Suaysai

Lovely Geologist 
 Nontanun Anchuleepradit (Kacha) as T-Rex
 Nachjaree Horvejkul (Cherreen) as Baiploo

Badass Baker 
 Chatchawit Techarukpong (Victor) as Dash
 Charada Imraporn (Piglet) as René

Absolute Economist 
 Isariya Patharamanop (Hunz) as Teddy
 Focus Jeerakul as (Chompink,Chompoo)

Foxy Pilot 
 Jirakit Thawornwong (Mek) as Hawk
 Zuvapit Traipornworakit (Baitoei) as Aurora

Playful Comm-Arts 
 Nawat Phumphotingam (White) as Kirun
 Sananthachat Thanapatpisal (Fon) as Sung

Extroverted Humanist 
 Chonlathorn Kongyingyong (Captain) as Kiryu
 Jannine Weigel (Ploychompoo) as Pinyin

Single Lawyer 
 Vachiravit Paisarnkulwong (August) as Firstclass
 Lapisara Intarasut (Apple) as Minute

Crazy Artist 
 Kunchanuj Kengkarnka (Kun) as Hippy
 Note Panayanggool as Melbe

Badly Politics 
 Thanat Lowkhunsombat (Lee) as Survey
 Lapassalan Jiravechsoontornkul (Mild) as Cherry Milk

Ambitious Boss 
 Chutavuth Pattarakampol (March) as Brian
 Worranit Thawornwong (Mook) as Mantou

Supporting and guest role

Appearing in all segments 
 Alysaya Tsoi (Alice) as Sylvia
 Korawit Boonsri (Gun) as Cholly

Handsome Cowboy 
 Kunchanuj Kengkarnka (Kun) as Hippy
 Jirakit Thawornwong (Mek) as Hawk
 Chonlathorn Kongyingyong (Captain) as Kiryu
 Kanut Rojanai (Baan) as Key
 Natthapat Wipatkornthrakul (Puifai) as Pitta
 Jirakit Kuariyakul (Toptap) as Hed
 Nachat Juntapun (Nicky) as Ped
 Surasak Chaiat (Su) as Sibtis' father
 Prakasit Bowsuwan as Prikkang's father

Gentle Vet 
 Achirawich Saliwattana (Gun) as Punpun
 Pronpiphat Pattanasettanon (Plustor) as Lorthep
 Natapat Patipokasut (Miss) as Pete
 Sutthipha Kongnawdee (Noon) as Jelly
 Nontanun Anchuleepradit (Kacha) as T-Rex
 Chatchawit Techarukpong (Victor) as Dash
 Kunchanuj Kengkarnka (Kun) as Hippy

Lovely Geologist 
 Pronpiphat Pattanasettanon (Plustor) as Lorthep
 Vorakorn Sirisorn (Kang) as Thesis
 Chatchawit Techarukpong (Victor) as Dash
 Kunchanuj Kengkarnka (Kun) as Hippy
 Tipnaree Weerawatnodom (Namtan) as Bell
 Weerayut Chansook (Arm) as Hym 
 Thanat Lowkhunsombat (Lee) as Survey

Badass Baker 
 Nontanun Anchuleepradit (Kacha) as T-Rex
 Kunchanuj Kengkarnka (Kun) as Hippy
 Thanat Lowkhunsombat (Lee) as Survey
 Sananthachat Thanapatpisal (Fon) as Sung
 Jatuchoke Wangsuwannakit (Go) as Mark
 Oranicha Krinchai (Proud) as Annie

Absolute Economist 
 Esther Supreeleela as Prikkang
 Thanat Lowkhunsombat (Lee) as Survey
 Thitipoom Techaapaikhun (New) as Pascal
 Nutticha Namwong (Kaykai) as Piglet
 Phadej Onlahoong as Tang Thai (Somsak)
 Poodit Chohksangiam as Tangmo (Somyot)
 Ramida Jiranorraphat (Jane) as Loma
 Zuvapit Traipornworakit (Baitoei) as Aurora
 Khoo Pei-Cong (Wave) as François

Foxy Pilot 
 Chonlathorn Kongyingyong (Captain) as Kiryu
 Kunchanuj Kengkarnka (Kun) as Hippy
 Weerayut Chansook (Arm) as Him
 Thitipoom Techaapaikhun (New) as Pascal
 Ramida Jiranorraphat (Jane) as Loma
 Khoo Pei-Cong (Wave) as François
 Tawan Vihokratana (Tay) as Philip
 Pluem Pongpisal as Kevin

Playful Comm-Arts 
 Chonlathorn Kongyingyong (Captain) as Kiryu
 Sutthipha Kongnawdee (Noon) as Jelly
 Tipnaree Weerawatnodom (Namtan) as Bell
 Weerayut Chansook (Arm) as Him
 Charada Imraporn (Piglet) as René
 Ramida Jiranorraphat (Jane) as Loma
 Nawat Phumphotingam (White) as Kirun
 Phakjira Kanrattanasood (Nanan) as Dizzy
 Parichat Praihirun as Kirun and Kiryu's mother
 Pluem Pongpisal as Kevin

Extroverted Humanist 
 Jirakit Thawornwong (Mek) as Hawk
 Kunchanuj Kengkarnka (Kun) as Hippy
 Weerayut Chansook (Arm) as Him
 Ramida Jiranorraphat (Jane) as Loma
 Nawat Phumphotingam (White) as Kirun
 Vachiravit Paisarnkulwong (August) as Firstclass
 Parichat Praihirun as Kirun and Kiryu's mother
 Lapisara Intarasut (Apple) as Minute
 Pimolwan Suphayang as Pinyin's mother
 Suradet Piniwat (Bas) as Set
 Pluem Pongpisal as Kevin

Single Lawyer 
 Chonlathorn Kongyingyong (Captain) as Kiryu
 Sutthipha Kongnawdee (Noon) as Jelly
 Tipnaree Weerawatnodom (Namtan) as Bell
 Weerayut Chansook (Arm) as Him
 Isariya Patharamanop (Hunz) as Teddy
 Focus Jeerakul as Chompink (Chompoo)
 Ramida Jiranorraphat (Jane) as Loma
 Nawat Phumphotingam (White) as Kirun
 Thanaboon Wanlopsirinun (Na) as Pitcher

Crazy Artist 
 Pluem Pongpisal as Kevin
 Phurikulkrit Chusakdiskulwibul (Amp) as Theo
 Puttichai Kasetsin (Push) as Sibtis
 Jirakit Thawornwong (Mek) as Hawk
 Chonlathorn Kongyingyong (Captain) as Kiryu
 Kunchanuj Kengkarnka (Kun) as Hippy
 Tipnaree Weerawatnodom (Namtan) as Bell
 Weerayut Chansook (Arm) as Him
 Thitipoom Techaapaikhun (New) as Pascal
 Ramida Jiranorraphat (Jane) as Loma

Badly Politics 
 Sutthipha Kongnawdee (Noon) as Jelly
 Nontanun Anchuleepradit (Kacha) as T-Rex
 Tipnaree Weerawatnodom (Namtan) as Bell
 Weerayut Chansook (Arm) as Him
 Ramida Jiranorraphat (Jane) as Loma
 Maripha Siripool (Wawa) as Kwangnoi
 Pattadon Janngeon (Fiat) as Fuse
 Krittanai Arsalprakit (Nammon) as Aob
 Paiboonkiat Kiewkaew as Andres
 Rachanee Siralert (Prae) as Regina Elisa
 Puimek Weerayuttvilai (Puimekster) as Princess Karin
 Chutavuth Pattarakampol (March) as Brian

Ambitious Boss 
 Jirakit Thawornwong (Mek) as Hawk
 Nontanun Anchuleepradit (Kacha) as T-Rex
 Chatchawit Techarukpong (Victor) as Dash
 Tipnaree Weerawatnodom (Namtan) as Bell
 Weerayut Chansook (Arm) as Him
 Thanat Lowkhunsombat (Lee) as Survey
 Pluem Pongpisal as Kevin
 Charada Imraporn (Piglet) as René
 Isariya Patharamanop (Hunz) as Teddy
 Ramida Jiranorraphat (Jane) as Loma
 Nawat Phumphotingam (White) as Kirun
 Sivakorn Lertchuchot (Guy) as Otto
 Jumpol Adulkittiporn (Off) as Li Tang
 Chanagun Arpornsutinan (Gunsmile) as Tanthai

Production

Casting 
In early 2016, GMMTV hosted the "Finding U-Prince Project", an online contest to recruit actors for the said television series. The results were announced on 3 April 2016 at the Eden Square, CentralWorld.

Soundtracks 
 Note Panayanggool -  (opening theme season 1, season 2 - episodes 1-2 and season 3)
 Tanont Chumroen - 
 Worranit Thawornwong - 
 Vonthongchai Intarawat - 
 Vorakorn Sirisorn -  (opening theme season 2 - episodes 3-4)
 Kunchanuj Kengkarnka - 
 Nontanun Anchuleepradit - 
 Chatchawit Techarukpong -  (opening theme season 4)
 Charada Imraporn -  (Sweet)
 Isariya Patharamanop and Focus Jeerakul -  (opening theme season 5)
 Jirakit Thawornwong -  (opening theme season 6)
 Chonlathorn Kongyingyong -  (opening theme seasons 7-8)
 Sarunyu Winaipanit -  (opening theme season 9)
 Kunchanuj Kengkarnka -  (opening theme season 10)
 Kunchanuj Kengkarnka - 
 Weerayut Chansook -  (opening theme season 11)
 Sivakorn Lertchuchot -  (opening theme season 12)
 Worranit Thawornwong -

Awards and nominations

References

External links 
 U-Prince Series on GMM 25 website 
 U-Prince Series on LINE TV
 GMMTV

Thai romantic comedy television series
2016 Thai television series debuts
2017 Thai television series endings
2010s teen drama television series
Television series by GMMTV
GMM 25 original programming
Television series by Baa-Ram-Ewe